The 51st Annual GMA Dove Awards presentation ceremony was recorded on Tuesday, September 1, 2020 through October 5, 2020, at the TBN in Hendersonville, Tennessee. The awards are given by the Gospel Music Association (GMA) recognizing the accomplishments of musicians and other figures within the Christian music industry for the year 2020. The awards show aired on the Trinity Broadcasting Network on Friday, October 30, 2020.

The nominations were announced by the GMA on August 13, 2020, with producer and songwriter Jason Ingram leading eight nominations among non-artists, while Zach Williams and For King & Country led the artist nominations with six. Due to the ongoing COVID-19 pandemic, the ceremony featured pre-recorded performances and no live acceptance speeches.

Nominations announcement 
The nominations were announced on August 13, 2020, by Brooke Ligertwood of Hillsong Worship, Joel Smallbone of For King & Country, Anthony Brown, Christine D'Clario, Joseph Habedank, and Aaron Cole from their individual homes, which was broadcast on the GMA Dove Awards' Facebook page, YouTube channel and Sirius XM/Pandora.

Nominees and winners 
This is a complete list of the nominees for the 51st GMA Dove Awards. Winners are in bold.

General 

Song of the Year
"Almost Home" 
(writers) Barry Graul, Bart Millard, Ben Glover, Mike Scheuchzer, Nathan Cochran, Robby Shaffer, (publishers) 9t One Songs, Ariose Music, No Sappy Music, Tunes of MercyMe
"Burn the Ships" 
(writers) Joel Smallbone, Luke Smallbone, Matt Hales, Seth Mosley, (publishers) CentricSongs, Kilns Music, Method to the Madness, Shankel Songs, Shaun Shankel Pub Designee, Warner-Tamerlane Publishing Corp., WC Music Corp.
"Dead Man Walking"
(writers) Emily Weisband, Jeremy Camp, Jordan Sapp, (publishers) Capitol CMG Paragon, Only in You Publishing, Songs By JSapp
"Deliver Me (This is My Exodus)" 
(writers) Desmond Davis, Donald Lawrence, Marshon Lewis, Robert Woolridge, William Stokes, (publishers) QW Publishing, William Stokes Publishing House and Primary Wave Beats, Shonmacmusic, ROBBASS ENC, Desmond Davis Designee
"Holy Water" 
(writers) Andrew Bergthold, Ed Cash, Franni Cash, Martin Cash, Scott Cash, (publishers) Andrew Bergthold Designee, Capitol CMG Genesis, Capitol CMG Paragon, We The Kingdom ASCAP Designee, We The Kingdom Music
"King of Kings" 
(writers) Brooke Ligertwood, Jason Ingram, Scott Ligertwood, (publishers) Fellow Ships Music, Hillsong Music Publishing Australia, So Essential Tunes
"Love Theory" 
(writers) Kirk Franklin, (publishers) Aunt Gertrude Music Publishing LLC
"Nobody" 
(writers) Bernie Herms, Mark Hall, Matthew West, (publishers) Be Essential Songs, Highly Combustible Music, House of Story Music Publishing, My Refuge Music, One77 Songs
"Rescue" 
(writers) Jason Ingram, Lauren Daigle, Paul Mabury, (publishers) CentricSongs, Fellow Ships Music, Flychild Publishing, See You at the Pub, So Essential Tunes
"Rescue Story" 
(writers) Andrew Ripp, Ethan Hulse, Jonathan Smith, Zach Williams, (publishers) Anthems of Hope, Be Essential Songs, Cashagamble Jet Music, EGH Music Publishing, Songs By Fishbone, Wisteria Drive
"See a Victory" 
(writers) Ben Fielding, Chris Brown, Jason Ingram, Steven Furtick, (publishers) Fellow Ships Music, Music by Elevation Worship Publishing, SHOUT! Music Publishing Australia, So Essential Tunes
"The God Who Stays"
(writers) AJ Pruis, Jonathan Smith, Matthew West, (publishers) Be Essential Songs, Cashagamble Jet Music, Combustion Five, Highly Combustible Music, One77 Songs, Two Story House Music
"Way Maker"
(writer) Osinachi Kalu Okoro Egbu, (publisher) Integrity Music Europe

Songwriter of the Year
Chris Brown
Kirk Franklin
Lauren Daigle
Matthew West
Zach Williams

Songwriter of the Year (Non-artist)
Ed Cash
Ethan Hulse
Jason Ingram
Jonathan Smith
Paul Mabury

Contemporary Christian Artist of the Year
For King & Country, Curb  Word
Hillsong United, Hillsong Music & Resources / Sparrow Records
Tauren Wells, Provident Music Group
TobyMac, Forefront / Capitol CMG
Zach Williams, Provident Label Group

Southern Gospel Artist of the Year
Ernie Haase & Signature Sound, Gaither Music
Gaither Vocal Band, Gaither Music
Jason Crabb, Red Street Records
Joseph Habedank, Daywind Records
Karen Peck & New River, Daywind Records

Gospel Artist of the Year
Jekalyn Carr, Lunjeal Music Group
Jonathan McReynolds, E1 Music
Kirk Franklin, RCAI
Tasha Cobbs Leonard, Motown Gospel
Travis Greene, RCAI

Artist of the Year
For King & Country, Curb  Word
Hillsong Worship, Hillsong Music & Resources/ Sparrow Records
Lauren Daigle, Centricity Music
Tasha Cobbs Leonard, Motown Gospel
Zach Williams, Provident Label Group

New Artist of the Year
Chris Renzema, Centricity
Cochren & Co., Gotee Records
Elle Limebear, Provident
Switch, Dream Records
We the Kingdom, Capitol CMG

Producer of the Year
Ben Isaacs
Ed Cash & Steven V. Taylor (Team)
Federico Vindver
Jonathan Smith
Jordan Sapp
Justin Savage
Michael Guy Chislett
Shaun Martin, Maxwell Stark, Ronald Hill (Team)
Wayne Haun

Rap/Hip Hop 

Rap/Hip Hop Recorded Song of the Year
"Keepin it movin am & guv demo.mp3" – Andy Mineo, Guvna B
(writers) Andrew Mineo, Ignacio Saucedo, Isaac Borquaye
"Follow God" – Kanye West
(writer) Kanye West
"Armies" – KB
(writers) Kevin Elijah Burgess, Wes Writer, Ed Cash, Scott McTyeire Cash, Chris Tomlin, Mashell Leroy
"Set Me Free" – Lecrae
(writers) Lecrae Moore, Osiris Williams, Christopher Hulvey, Erica Atkins-Campbell, Gabriel Azucena, J Raul Garcia, Torey D'Shaun
"Enough" – Social Club Misfits
(writers) Jordan Sapp, Kyle Williams, Martin Santiago, Fernando Miranda

Rap/Hip Hop Album of the Year
Not By Chance – Aaron Cole
(producers) Cole Walowac, Chris King, Chino
Work in Progress – Andy Mineo
(producers) Evan Ford, Joel McNeill of 42 North, Iggy Music, GAWVI, Matthew Scott Cohen, Nottz, !llmind
Heathen – Gawvi
(producers) Gawvi, Jonathan Barahona, Tyshane Thompson, Garnell Watts, Matt Cohen, Jon Jon, Justin Barahona
Jesus Is King – Kanye West
(producers) Kanye West, Federico Vindver, Budgie, E. Vax, BoogzDaBeast, Francis Starlite, Benny Blanco, Xcelence, Brian 'Allday', Angel Lopez, Timbaland, Michael Cerda, Pi'erre Bourne, Warryn Campbell, Labrinth, DrtWrk
MOOD // DOOM – Social Club Misfits(producers) Chris Howland, Chris King, Daramola, Derek Minor, Desmond South, Evan Ford, Gavin George, Iggy Music, Jacob Cardec, Jimi Cravity, Jordan Sapp, Lasanna "Ace" Harris, Mashell Leroy, Sean Hamilton, Sean Minor, Shama "Sak Pase" Joseph, Steve "Pompano Puff" Tirogene, Tedashii Anderson, Tee Wyla, Zach Paradis Rock/Contemporary 

Rock/Contemporary Recorded Song of the Year
"More Than Bones" – Demon Hunter
(writers) Patrick Judge, Ryan Clark
"Juggernaut" – John Mark McMillan
(writers) John Mark McMillan
"My Arms" – Ledger
(writers) Jennifer Ledger, Colby Wedgeworth, Ethan Hulse
"Royal Blood" - RICHLIN
(writers) Brandon Richardson, Zach Holmes"Legendary" - Skillet(writers) John L. Cooper, Korey Cooper, Seth MosleyRock/Contemporary Album of the Year
Out of Body – Apollo LTD
(producer) Ground Control
Peace – Demon Hunter
(producer) Jeremiah Scott
Love Letter Kill Shot – Disciple
(producer) Travis Wyrick
Declaration – Red
(producers) Rob GravesVictorious – Skillet(producers) John L. Cooper, Korey Cooper, Kevin Churko, Seth Mosley, Mike "X" O'Connor Pop/Contemporary 

Pop/Contemporary Recorded Song of the Year
"Nobody" – Casting Crowns featuring Matthew West
(writers) Bernie Herms, Matthew West, Mark Hall
"Burn the Ships" – For King & Country
(writers) Joel Smallbone, Luke Smallbone, Seth Mosley, Matt Hales
"Dead Man Walking" - Jeremy Camp
(writers) Emily Weisband, Jeremy Camp, Jordan Sapp"Rescue" – Lauren Daigle(writers) Jason Ingram, Lauren Daigle, Paul Mabury"Holy Water" - We the Kingdom
(writers) Andrew Bergthold, Ed Cash, Franni Cash, Martin Cash, Scott Cash

Pop/Contemporary Album of the Year
The Story's Not Over – Jeremy Camp
(producer) Jeff Sojka, Jordan Sapp, Colby Wedgeworth, Ben GloverCitizen of Heaven – Tauren Wells(producers) Chuck Butler, Jordan Sapp, Kirk Franklin, Max Stark, Colby Wedgeworth, Rascal FlattsReason – Unspoken
(producers) Chris Stevens, Dave Clauss, Jeff Pardo, Tedd Tjornhom, David Spencer
Live at the Wheelhouse – We the Kingdom
(producers) We the Kingdom
Rescue Story – Zach Williams
(producers) Jonathan Smith

 Inspirational 

Inspirational Recorded Song of the Year
"Now Is Forever" – Gaither Vocal Band
(writers) Gloria Gaither, William J. Gaither, Gordon Mote
"I Give Up" – Laura Story
(writer) Laura Story
"His Mercy Is More" – Matt Boswell & Matt Papa
(writers) Matt Boswell, Matt Papa"Yet Not I But Through Christ in Me" – Selah(writers) Michael Farren, Rich Thompson, Jonny Robinson"He Touched Me/There's Something About That Name/Because He Lives-Medley" – Steven Curtis Chapman
(writers) Gloria Gaither, William J. Gaither

Inspirational Album of the Year
Don't Wanna Miss This – Cana's Voice
(producers) Wayne Haun, Jim Hammerley, Jerard Woods
Faultlines Vol. II – Kalley
(producer) Jason Ingram
I Give Up – Laura Story
(producers) Craig Swift, Chris Bevins
His Mercy Is More: The Hymns of Matt Boswell and Matt Papa – Matt Boswell, Matt Papa, Keith & Kristyn Getty
(producers) Nathan NockelsFirm Foundation – Selah(producers) Brent Milligan, Chris Bevins, Jason Kyle Saetveit Southern Gospel 

Southern Gospel Recorded Song of the Year
"This Is the Place" – Gaither Vocal Band
(writers) Gloria Gaither, William J. Gaither, Gordon Mote
"The God I Serve" – Karen Peck & New River
(writers) Rebecca Bowman, Sonya Yeary, Karen Peck Gooch, Jimmy Yeary
"What Kind of Man" – Legacy Five
(writers) Kenna Turner West, Jason Cox, Sue Smith"The Power of an Empty Tomb" – The Erwins(writer) Joel Lindsey"Can I Get A Witness" – The Sound
(writers) Kenna Turner West, Brent Baxter, Jason Cox

Southern Gospel Album of the Year
Mercy & Love – Bill & Gloria Gaither and their Homecoming Friends
(producers) Bill Gaither, Kevin Williams
That Day Is Coming Live – Collingsworth Family
(producer) Wayne Haun, Kim CollingsworthPure Love – Legacy Five(producers) Scott Fowler, Wayne Haun, Trey Ivey20/20 – The Crabb Family
(producer) Dottie Leonard Miller, Jason Crabb, Scott Godsey
The Crown – The McKameys
(producers) Jeff Collins, Roger Fortner

 Bluegrass/Country/Roots 

Bluegrass/Country/Roots Recorded Song of the Year
"He Won't Let Go" - Gloria Gaynor, featuring Bart Millard
(writers) Gloria Gaynor, Andrew Ramsey, Shannon Sanders
"Sometimes It's The Radio" – Joseph Habedank
(writers) Joseph Habedank, Tony Wood, Jimmy Yeary"Ain't No Grave" – Karen Peck & New River(writers) Jonathan David Helser, Melissa Helser and Molly Skaggs"Elizabeth" – Keith & Kristyn Getty, Ellie Holcomb
(writers) Kristyn Getty, Ellie Holcomb
"Amazing Grace" – The Oak Ridge Boys
(writer) John Newton

Bluegrass/Country/Roots Album of the Year
Testimony – Gloria Gaynor
(producer) Chris Stevens, F. Reid Shippen
You Are Loved – Jeff & Sheri Easter
(producers) Jeff Easter, Sheri Easter, Greg ColeGod & Country – Jimmy Fortune(producers) Ben IsaacsA Great Adventure, LIVE Solo Performances of Timeless Hits - Steven Curtis Chapman
(producers) Steven Curtis Chapman, Bill Gaither
No Depression in Heaven: The Gospel Songs of the Carter Family - The Chuck Wagon Gang
(producers) David Johnson, Jeff Collins

 Contemporary Gospel 

Contemporary Gospel Recorded Song of the Year
"Blessings On Blessings" – Anthony Brown & Group therAPy
(writer) Anthony Brown
"Won't Be Moved" - Gene Moore
(writers) Bryan Sledge, Cedric Smith, Dameon Reeves"People" – Jonathan McReynolds(writer) Jonathan McReynolds"B!g" – Pastor Mike Jr.
(writer) Michael McClure, Curtiss Glenn, Rodeny Turner
"Won't Let Go" – Travis Greene
(writers) Travis Greene

Contemporary Gospel Album of the Year
2econd Wind: Ready – Anthony Brown & Group therAPy
(producers) Anthony Brown, Justin Savage
TIME – Deitrick Haddon
(producers) Deitrick Haddon, Marcus Hodge
People – Jonathan McReynolds
(producers) Jonathan McReynolds, Darryl "LiLMaN" Howell, Rogest "Rosco" Carstarphen, Jr.
KIERRA – Kierra Sheard
(producer) J. Drew Sheard II Long Live Love – Kirk Franklin(producers) Kirk Franklin, Shaun Martin, Maxwell Stark, Ronald Hill, S1 for SKP. Inc. Traditional Gospel 

Traditional Gospel Recorded Song of the Year
"Truly Amazing God" – John P. Kee
(writer) John P. Kee
"It Keeps Happening" – Kierra Sheard
(writers) J. Drew Sheard, Kierra Valencia Sheard"I'm All In" – Maranda Curtis(writers) Asaph Ward, Dana Sorey, Maranda Curtis"All in His Plan" – PJ Morton, featuring Mary Mary & Le'Andria Johnson
(writer) PJ Morton
"Victory" – The Clark Sisters
(writer) J. Drew Sheard, Karen Clark-Sheard

Traditional Gospel Album of the Year
A Different Song – Donnie McClurkin
(producers) Donnie McClurkin, Trent Phillips, Tre' Corley
I Made It Out – John P. Kee
(producer) John P. Kee
Bless Somebody Else – Kurt Carr
(producer) Kurt Carr
Jesus Is Born – Sunday Service Choir
(producer) Kanye West, Jason White, Nikki Grier, Philip CornishThe Return – The Clark Sisters(producer) J. Drew Sheard II, Warryn Campbell, Eric Dawkins, Mano Hanes, Rodney Jerkins, Justin Brooks, Jermaine Dupri, Damien Sneed, Kurt Carr, Karen Clark-Sheard Gospel Worship 

Gospel Worship Recorded Song of the Year
"Miracle Worker" – JJ Hairston
(writer) Rich Tolbert Jr."Something Has To Break (Live)" – Kierra Sheard, featuring Tasha Cobbs Leonard(writers) J. Drew Sheard, Kierra Valencia Sheard, Mia Fieldes, Jonathan Smith"Promises" – Maverick City Music
(writers) Aaron Moses, Lemuel Marin, Carrington Gaines, Dante Bowe, Joe L. Barnes, Keila Alvarado
"Proverbs 3" – Todd Dulaney
(writers) Todd Dulaney, Jaylen Moore, Isaac Tarver
"Only You Can Satisfy (Live)" – William McDowell, Chris Lawson
(writers) William McDowell, Chandler Moore

Gospel Worship Album of the Year
Miracle Worker – JJ Hairston
JJ Hairston
Maverick City Vol. 3 Part 1 – Maverick City Music
(producers) Tony Brown, Jonathan JayBroken Record – Travis Greene(producers) Travis Greene, Brunes CharlesElements – VaShawn Mitchell
(producers) VaShawn Mitchell, Thomas Hardin Jr.
The Cry – William McDowell
(producers) William McDowell, Clay Bogan III

 Spanish Language 

Spanish Language Recorded Song of the Year"Loco Amor" – Christine D'Clario(writer) Chris McClarney, Jacob Sooter, Ricky Jackson"Solo Dios Sabe (God Only Knows)" – For King & Country, featuring Miel San Marcos
(writers) Joel Smallbone, Jordan Reynolds, Josh Kerr, Luke Smallbone, Tedd Tjornhom
"Santo río de Dios" – Marcos Witt
(writer) Jonathan Mark Witt
"Way Maker" – Priscilla Bueno
(writer) Osinachi Okoro
"Filipenses 1:6 (ft. Almighty)" – Redimi2
(writers) Alejandro Mosqueda, Willy González

Spanish Language Album of the Year
Soldados – Alex Campos
(producers) Alex Campos, Javier Serrano, Juan Botello, Madiel Lara, Andres Castro, Saga WhiteBlack, Ceferino Caban
Shekinah (Live) – Barak
(producers) Angelo Frilop, Janiel PoncianoAleluya (En La Tierra) – Elevation Worship(producers) Chris Brown, Steven FurtickOrigen y Esencia – Jesus Adrian Romero
(producer) Kiko Cibrian
Sinergia – Un Corazón y LEAD
(producer) Otho Castro

 Worship 

Worship Recorded Song of the Year
"King Of Kings (Live at Qudos Bank Arena, Sydney, AU/2019)" – Hillsong Worship
(writers) Brooke Ligertwood, Scot Ligertwood, Jason Ingram
"Goodness of God" – Jenn Johnson
(writers) Ben Fielding, Brian Johnson, Jenn Johnson, Ed Cash, Jason Ingram"The Blessing (Live)" – Kari Jobe, Cody Carnes, Elevation Worship(writers) Kari Jobe Carnes, Cody Carnes, Chris Brown, Steven Furtick"Way Maker" – Leeland
(writer) Osinach Okoro
"Great Things" – Phil Wickham
(writers) Phil Wickham, Jonas Myrin

Worship Album of the Year
Peace – Bethel Music
(producer) Ed Cash, Jeff Schneeweis, Steven V. Taylor
At Midnight – Elevation Worship
(producers) Aaron Robertson, Steven Furtick
People (Deluxe/Live in Sydney, Australia) – Hillsong United
(producer) Michael Guy Chislett, Joel HoustonAwake – Hillsong Worship(producers) Michael Guy Chislett, Brooke Ligertwood, Ben Tan, Ben TennikoffAlive & Breathing – Matt Maher
(producers) Matt Maher, Mitch Parks

 Other categories 

Instrumental Album of the Year
Tune My Heart...Songs of Rest & Reflection – Andrew Greer & Friends
(producers) Andrew Greer, Travis Patton, Kyle Buchanan
Without Words: Genesis – Bethel Music
(producers) Seth Mosley, Michael "X" O'Connor, LaelUntitled Hymn: A Collection of Hymns (Instrumental) – Chris Rice(producers) Chris Rice, Ken LewisAmbientes de Adoracion – Miel San Marcos
(producers) Josh Morales, Luis Morales Jr., Chris Rocha, Samy Morales, Juan Velásquez
Instrumental Songs Of Worship – The Maker & The Instrument
(producer) Tommee Profitt

Children's Album of the YearSing: Remembering Songs – Ellie Holcomb(producers) Nate Dugger, Brown BannisterSongs Of Some Silliness – Hillsong Kids, Funny Man Dan
(producer) David Wakerley
Getty Kids Hymnal - Family Carol Sing – Keith & Kristyn Getty
(producers) Fionán de Barra, Jonathan Rea, Keith & Kristyn Getty
Babies (Musica para bebes) – Miel San Marcos
(producers) Josh Morales, Luis Morales Jr., Samy Morales, Jorge Privado
Sparkle. Pop. Rampage. – Rend Co. Kids, Rend Collective
(producers) Gareth Gilkeson, Chris Llewellyn

Christmas / Special Event Album of the Year
Behold the Lamb of God (15th Anniversary) – Andrew Peterson
(producer) Ben Shive
A True Family Christmas – Collingsworth Family
(producer) Bradley Knight
The Greatest Gift: A Christmas Collection – Danny Gokey
(producers) Hank Bentley, Colby Wedgeworth, Ben Glover, Jeff Pardo, Bernie HermsChristmas – Phil Wickham(producer) Jonathan SmithWhat Christmas Really Means – The Erwins
(producers) Wayne Haun, Trey Ivey

Musical of the Year
An Unexpected Christmas
(creators) Daniel Semsen, Joel Lindsey, Jeff Bumgardner, Heidi Petak, (arranger/orchestrator) Daniel Semsen
Is He Worthy
(creators) Russell Mauldin, Sue C. SmithMessiah Overcame – An Easter Musical
(creators) Mike Harland, John Rowsey, (Arrangers/Orchestrators) Cliff Duren, Jim Hammerly, Christopher Phillips, Phil Nitz
Song of Joy
(creator) Dale Mathews, (arranger/orchestrator) Marty Hamby
The Song of Bethlehem
(creator) Lee Black, (arrangers/orchestrators) Cliff Duren, Phillip Keveren, Phil Nitz

Youth / Children's Musical of the Year
Back to the Beginning
(creator) Christy Semsen, (arranger) Daniel Semsen
Do Not Be Afraid Parade
(creators) Nick Robertson, Anna Lampe, (arranger) Nick Robertson
Good News Ahead...The Signs of Christmas!
(creators) Gina Boe, Barb Dorn
The Joy of Christmas
(creators) Terryl Padilla, John Roberts
The Little Drummer Dude(creator) Christy Semsen, (arranger) Daniel Semsen

Choral Collection of the Year
Our Faithful God
(creators) Mike Harland, Chris Machen, Diane Machen, (arranger/orchestrator) Cliff Duren
Southern Gospel Sounds
(arranger/orchestrator) Marty Hamby
Spirit Rise
(arranger) Travis Cottrell
Sunday Southern Favorites
(creator/arranger) Marty HambyTop Anthem Collection(creator) Johnathan Crumpton, (arrangers) Bradley Knight, Cliff Duren, Mike Speck, Marty Parks, Daniel Semsen, Gary Rhodes, Dave Williamson, Geron Davis, Tom Fettke, Russell MauldinRecorded Music Packaging of the Year
Behold the Lamb of God (15th Anniversary) – Andrew Peterson
(art directors) Joshua Wurzelbacher, Stephen Crotts, (photographers) Bob Boyd, Alicia St. Gelais, Keely Scott, Jenna Morris
Choose to Worship – Rend Collective
(art director/graphic designer) Drew Kellum, (photographer) Jude Thompson
Forever Amen – Steffany Gretzinger
(art director) Tim Parker, (graphic artist) Tim Parker, (photographer) Sean Frizzell
Let There Be Wonder – Matt Redman
(art director) Jason B. Jones, (designers) Jordan Rubino, OneSixOne, (photography) Lee Steffen, (Illustrator) Micaela Alcaino
Perspectives – David Dunn
(art director) Ryan ClarkRescue Story – Zach Williams(art director/graphic artist) Tim Parker, (photographer) Eric Brown Videos and films 

Short Form Video of the Year
Citizen of Heaven – Tauren Wells
(director) Matt DeLisi, (producer) Ryan Atenhan"God Only Knows – For King & Country, featuring Dolly Parton(directors/producers) Ben Smallbone, Patrick TohillReason – Unspoken
(director) Max Hsu, Nathan Schneider, (producers) Joshua Wurzelbacher, Alicia St. Gelais
Trilogy – Silent Planet
(director/producer) Kevin Johnson
Wanted – Danny Gokey
(director) Elliott Eicheldinger, (producer) Loren Hughes

Long Form Video of the Year
A Great Adventure, LIVE Solo Performances of Timeless Hits – Steven Curtis Chapman
(director/producer) Doug StuckeyAwake (Live) – Hillsong Worship(directors) Richard Cause, Jared Chapman, Paul Martin, Samuel Irving, Steven Lester, (producers) Johnny Rays, Jessica Ico, Steven LesterThe Wait (Movie) – David Leonard
(director) Elliot Eicheldinger, (producers) The Creak Music, Integrity Music
Building a Christmas to Remember – The Singing Contractors
(directors/producers) Michael Sykes, Joel Key, Doug Stuckey
People (Visual Album) – Jonathan McReynolds
(director) Austin Peckham
Roar (Live) – Passion
(director) Steven Lester, (producers) Shelley Giglio, Rachel Baldwin, Leighton Ching, Matt Reed

Inspirational Film of the Year
A Beautiful Day in the Neighborhood
(director) Marielle Heller, (producers) Youree Henley, Leah Holzer, Peter Saraf, Wenxin She, Marc Turtletaub
Bethany Hamilton: Unstoppable
(director) Aaron Lieber, (producers) Penny Edmiston, Jane Kelly Kosek, Aaron LieberI Still Believe(director) Andrew Erwin, Jon Erwin, (producers) Kevin Downes, Andrew Erwin, Jon Erwin'''Overcomer(director) Alex Kendrick, (producers) Stephen Kendrick, Aaron Burns, Justin TolleyThe Clark Sisters: First Ladies of Gospel''
(directors) Christine Swanson, (producers) Ronnie J. Pitre, Steve Solomos

References

External links 
 

2020 music awards
GMA Dove Awards
2020 in American music
2020 in Tennessee
GMA